Jānis Andersons (born October 7, 1986) is a Latvian ice hockey defenceman, currently playing for Indian Žiar nad Hronom of the Slovak Hockey League.

Career statistics

Regular season and playoffs

International

External links
 

1986 births
Living people
AIK IF players
Almtuna IS players
HC 07 Detva players
HC Dukla Jihlava players
HK Dukla Trenčín players
HC Havířov players
Heilbronner EC players
Hokej Šumperk 2003 players
Kompanion Kiev players
LHK Jestřábi Prostějov players
Latvian ice hockey defencemen
HK Liepājas Metalurgs players
HC Nové Zámky players
HC Oceláři Třinec players
Dinamo Riga players
HK Riga 2000 players
Prizma Riga players
Ice hockey people from Riga
VHK Vsetín players
MsHK Žilina players
HKM Zvolen players
HK MŠK Indian Žiar nad Hronom players
Slovak Hockey League players
Slovak Extraliga players
Expatriate ice hockey players in Slovakia
Expatriate ice hockey players in the Czech Republic
Expatriate ice hockey players in Sweden
Expatriate ice hockey players in Ukraine
Expatriate ice hockey players in Germany
Latvian expatriate sportspeople in Germany
Latvian expatriate sportspeople in Ukraine
Latvian expatriate sportspeople in Sweden
Latvian expatriate sportspeople in the Czech Republic
Latvian expatriate sportspeople in Slovakia
Latvian expatriate ice hockey people